Scotswood Works Halt railway station served the area of Scotswood, Newcastle-upon-Tyne, England from 1915 to 1944 on the Tyne Valley Line.

History 
The station opened on 25 August 1915 by the North Eastern Railway. The station was situated between Scotswood Road and Coanwood Road. It was originally opened for workers in the First World War in the Armstrong Whitworth's munitions factory. The halt was enlarged by the Ministry of Munitions due to the high number of traffic. After the workforce's decline, Armstrong Whitworth acquired the government's interest in the platforms and buildings and offered them to LNER. The station was first closed on 27 September 1924 but reopened on 7 April 1941 to serve the munitions workforce again, but closed again in 1944.

References

External links 

Former North Eastern Railway (UK) stations
Railway stations in Great Britain opened in 1915
Railway stations in Great Britain closed in 1924
Railway stations in Great Britain opened in 1941
Railway stations in Great Britain closed in 1944
1915 establishments in England
1944 disestablishments in England